Palisades is the third studio album by American post-hardcore band Palisades. The album was released on January 20, 2017, by Rise Records. In the US, it peaked at number 3 on the Heatseekers chart, number 18 on the Hard Rock Albums chart, and number 12 on the Independent Albums chart.

Track listing

Personnel
Palisades
 Louis Miceli – lead vocals, unclean vocals
 Xavier Adames – lead guitar, backing vocals
 Matthew Marshall – rhythm guitar
 Brandon Elgar – bass guitar, backing vocals, co-lead vocals
 Aaron Rosa – drums, percussion
 Christian "DJ" Graves" Mochizuki – turntables, sampling, keyboards, synthesizers, programmingProduction
 Erik Ron – producer

Charts

References

2017 albums
Palisades (band) albums
Rise Records albums
Albums produced by Erik Ron